X3 may refer to:

Arts, entertainment, and media

Films
 X-Men: The Last Stand, also known as X3 and X-Men 3, the third film in the comic book film series
 XXX: Return of Xander Cage, a 2017 American film directed by D. J. Caruso

Literature and publications
 X3, a collection of three science fiction novellas by Gary A. Braunbeck

Music
 X3 (group), a short-lived Australian girl group, circa 2000
 X3 (album), a 2004 solo album by Japanese pop singer Aya Matsuura

Video games
 X-Men: The Official Game, a 2006 videogame prequel to X-Men: The Last Stand
 X³: Reunion, a space simulation computer game
 X³: Terran Conflict, a sequel to X³: Reunion
 X³: Albion Prelude, an addon to X³: Terran Conflict
 Dance Dance Revolution X3, a 2011 music video game by Konami
 Mega Man X3, a 1995 platforming game in Capcom's Mega Man X series

Electronics

Instruments
 Korg X3, a synthesizer

Phones
 Kyocera X3, an Android One smartphone by Kyocera
 Mobile phone models by Nokia
Nokia X3-00 or Nokia X3
Nokia X3 Touch and Type or Nokia X3-02

Sensors
 Foveon X3 sensor, a layered image sensor design

Mathematics, science, and technology

Astronomy
 Cygnus X-3, a binary x-ray source in the sky

Computer science
 X3, one former name of a subcommittee of ANSI, now International Committee for Information Technology Standards (INCITS)
 X3 (code) aka Excess-3, a binary code also termed Stibitz code
 XKO X3, an ERP software

Mathematics
 X3, the mathematical cubic function

Transportation

Aircraft
 Douglas X-3 Stiletto, an experimental jet aircraft
 Eurocopter X3, an experimental compound helicopter under development by Eurocopter

Automobiles
 Beijing X3, a Chinese subcompact crossover SUV
 BMW X3, a German compact SUV
 Cowin X3, a Chinese compact SUV
 Geely Vision X3, a Chinese subcompact crossover
 Jingyi X3, a Chinese subcompact crossover

Bus routes
 X3 (New York City bus)
 X3, a Metrobus route in Washington, D.C. U.S.

IATA codes
 TUI fly Deutschland (IATA airline designator X3 since 2007)
 Hapag-Lloyd Express (IATA airline designator X3, 2002-2007)

Motorcycles
 Ilmor X3 (also termed the X³), a MotoGP race motorbike

Spacecraft
 X-3, the Prospero (satellite) launched by the UK in 1971

Trains
 X3 (train), a Swedish train built by Alstom

Watercraft
 HMS X3, an X-class submarine of the Royal Navy

Graffiti
X3(Suffix) is a common Gang tag Signature that is associated with the Mexican Mafia aka "La Eme" x3 is the notion of Roman Numeral 10 + 3 which is 13 for the Letter M; that is the thirteenth Letter of the Spanish  and English Alphabets. Every allianced gang will include Some form or variant of the x3 or 13 in their Graffiti tagging.

See also
 3X (disambiguation)